The 1903 Gordon Bennett Cup, formally titled the IV Coupe Internationale, was a motor race held on 2 July 1903, on the Athy Circuit consisting of closed roads in Ireland. The race consisted of seven laps - alternating for six laps over a shorter circuit to the west of Athy and longer circuit to the East, before a final lap on the longer circuit to make the total distance 527 km (327.5 miles). A British entry had won the previous edition of the race, which meant that the rights to host the race fell to the Automobile Club of Britain and Ireland. Legislation was passed to allow the race to take place on roads in Ireland, then a part of the United Kingdom. Britain were to attempt to defend the Gordon Bennett Cup against France, Germany and the USA, and each country was represented by three entries, with the car that finished the race in the shortest time winning the race on behalf of his country.

Rene de Knyff and Henry Farman, both driving Panhards and representing France finished in second and third places, taking a little over ten minutes longer to complete the course than Jenatzy.

Race report

On Thursday, 2 July 1903 the Gordon Bennett Cup was the first international motor race to be held in Ireland, an honorific to Selwyn Edge who had won the 1902 event in the Paris-Vienna race driving a Napier. The Automobile Club of Great Britain and Ireland wanted the race to be hosted in the British Isles, and their secretary, Claude Johnson, suggested Ireland as the venue because racing was illegal on British public roads. The editor of the Dublin Motor News, Richard J. Mecredy, suggested an area in County Kildare, and letters were sent to 102 Irish MPs, 90 Irish peers, 300 newspapers, 34 chairmen of county and local councils, 34 County secretaries, 26 mayors, 41 railway companies, 460 hoteliers, 13 PPs, plus the Bishop of Kildare and Leighlin, Patrick Foley, who pronounced himself in favour. Local laws had to be adjusted, ergo the 'Light Locomotives (Ireland) Bill' was passed on 27 March 1903. Kildare and other local councils drew attention to their areas, whilst County Laois declared That every facility will be given and the roads placed at the disposal of motorists during the proposed race. Eventually Kildare was chosen, partly on the grounds that the straightness of the roads would be a safety benefit. As a compliment to Ireland the British team chose to race in Shamrock green which thus became known as British racing green, although the winning Napier of 1902 had been painted Olive green.

There was considerable public concern about safety after the 1901 Paris-Bordeaux Rally, in which at least eight people had been killed, and severe accidents during the May 24th 1903 Paris-Madrid race where more than 200 cars competed over a distance of  but which had to be halted at Bordeaux because there had been so many accidents. To allay these fears the 1903 race was held over a closed course which had been carefully prepared for the event, and was marshalled by 7,000 police officers assisted by troops and club stewards, with strict instructions to keep spectators off the roads and away from corners. The route consisted of two loops in a figure eight, the first a  loop including Kilcullen, The Curragh, Kildare, Monasterevin, Stradbally, Athy, followed by a  loop through Castledermot, Carlow, and Athy again. The race started at the Ballyshannon cross-roads near Calverstown on the contemporary N78 heading north, then followed the N9 north; the N7 west; the N80 south; the N78 north again; the N9 south; the N80 north; the N78 north again.
The official timekeeper of the race was Mr. T. H. Woolen of the Automobile Club of Great Britain and Ireland. Ninety one Chronographs for timing the race were supplied by the Anglo-Swiss firm Stauffer Son & Co. of La Chaux-de-Fonds and London. Competitors were started at seven-minute intervals and had to follow bicycles through the 'control zones' in each town.

The   race was won by the famous Belgian Camille Jenatzy, driving a Mercedes in German colours. It was "inferior in terms of horse power", but suited to Jenazy's driving style, and he turned in a spectacular performance. His purse for the win was £8000.

Classification

References

Bibliography
 

Gordon Bennett Cup (auto racing)
Gordon Bennett Cup
Gordon Bennett Cup
July 1903 sports events